Reading Hardware Company, also known as "The Hardware," is a historic factory complex and national historic district located in Reading, Berks County, Pennsylvania.  The district includes five contributing buildings along with the previously listed Reading Hardware Company Butt Works. They include brick and heavy timber frame buildings dated to the late-19th century, and early-20th century reinforced concrete buildings.

It was listed on the National Register of Historic Places in 1997.

References

Historic districts on the National Register of Historic Places in Pennsylvania
Industrial buildings and structures on the National Register of Historic Places in Pennsylvania
Industrial buildings completed in 1888
Buildings and structures in Berks County, Pennsylvania
National Register of Historic Places in Reading, Pennsylvania